Guitars and Microphones is the debut studio solo album by Kate Pierson of The B-52s. It was released in February 2015 under Lazy Meadow Music.

Track listing

References

External links

2015 debut albums
Kate Pierson albums